Tamara Jane Beckwith (born 17 April 1970) is an English socialite and television personality. In the 1990s, she was regarded as one of the "It girls" of the London social scene.

Early life
The daughter of property developer Peter Beckwith, Beckwith grew up in Kew, southwest London, where she attended the local state primary school, Queens School, before moving to Wimbledon, London in the early 1980s. She attended Cheltenham Ladies' College, before leaving to attend the sixth form college, MPW in London, although she left in order to have her first daughter, Anouska Poppy Pearl (born 1987, Westminster, London), fathered by William Gerhauser, son of Bill Gerhauser, Finance Director of the Playboy global empire. Anouska is a photographer based in Paris.

Career
Beckwith has appeared on many television programmes such as Shooting Stars, Brass Eye, Loose Women, Celebrities Under Pressure, The Big Breakfast, Trigger Happy TV, I'm Famous and Frightened!, So You Want To Be A Teacher and Dancing on Ice. She has been a presenter for MTV, VH1 and regularly appeared as a reporter for television shows including This Morning and Watchdog.

In 2007, she appeared on the BBC's reality TV programme Celebrity Scissorhands where Lee Stafford trained celebrities to cut hair, raising money as part of the BBC charity Children in Need. Beckwith has also appeared in The Vagina Monologues.

On 10 April 2008, Beckwith participated in a celebrity edition of the Channel 4 show Come Dine with Me with MC Harvey, Jonathan Ansell and Lynsey de Paul. Beckwith finished in third place.. She appeared a further time on Come Dine with Me in 2011.

Beckwith was one of the dealers on the Channel 4 show Four Rooms, in the third series which aired daily from April 2013.

Beckwith designs a range of Diamonique jewellery for QVC UK.  She became a contributing editor for Gift-Library.com, an online gift website, run and founded by her friend Caroline Stanbury.  She is a contributing Editor for Hello writing and styling features with others including John and Gela Taylor, Eden Sassoon and Stephen Webster.

She opened The Little Black Gallery, a photography gallery in Chelsea, London, in November 2008.

She was a contestant on Series 3 of The Jump in 2016.

Personal life
Beckwith was engaged to Sharon Stone's brother, Michael, before marrying construction heir Giorgio Veroni in Venice on 27 August 2007.

On 2 September 2008, while appearing on ITV2's CelebAir, it was revealed that Beckwith was pregnant with her second child, a daughter, Violet, born in 2009.

On 26 October 2014 they had a son, named Vero after his father.

Sir John Beckwith is her uncle.

References

External links
 
 BBC, Celebrity Scissorhands
 Tamara Beckwith Official Site

1970 births
Living people
English socialites
People educated at Cheltenham Ladies' College
English businesspeople
21st-century British women